Venados de Mazatlán are a professional baseball team in the Mexican Pacific League based in Mazatlan, Sinaloa.

In 2016, the team won the Mexican Pacific League Championship and went on to win their second Caribbean Series, which was played in Santo Domingo, Dominican Republic.

2004–2005 season
In the 2004–2005 season, the Venados of Mazatlán won the Mexican Pacific League title for the seventh time. The Caribbean Series was held at Teodoro Mariscal Stadium in Mazatlán, and the Venados performed well out of the gate, winning twice against the Dominican Republic's Águilas Cibaeñas and Puerto Rico's Indios de Mayaguez.

The 2005 team had a star-studded lineup, including Miguel Ojeda, Elmer Dessens, Luis Ayala, Jorge Campillo, Vinny Castilla, Erubiel Durazo, Johnny Gomes, and Francisco Campos. The Venados beat Venezuela's Tigres de Aragua in their first head-to-head game, with Campos pitching a three-hit shutout.

Campos went on to pitch in the final against the Aguilas, pitching eight innings and giving up two runs and three hits for the victory in a 4-3 Venados win.  The resulting Caribbean Series Championship was the first in club history.

Stadium
Estadio Teodoro Mariscal was constructed in 1962 with a capacity of 14,000 and is primarily used for baseball. It is 325 feet down the stadium's right and left field lines and 400 feet to the center field wall. The stadium is located in between Avenida Insurgentes and Reforma near Bosque de la Ciudad and The Aquarium. A famous singer, El Coyote, is said to regularly attend Venados games at Estudio Marsical. In 2000 the stadium underwent a major remodeling that expanded capacity from 12,000 to 14,000.

Roster

References

External links
 Official site

Mazatlan Venados
Mazatlán
Sports teams in Sinaloa
Baseball teams established in 1945
1945 establishments in Mexico